2017 Shenzhen Open – Singles may refer to:

2017 ATP Shenzhen Open – Singles
2017 WTA Shenzhen Open – Singles
2017 Shenzhen Longhua Open – Men's Singles
2017 Shenzhen Longhua Open – Women's Singles

See also 

2017 Shenzhen Open (disambiguation)
2017 Shenzhen Longhua Open